The 2023 Pittsburgh Pirates season will be the franchise's 142nd season overall, 137th season as a member of the National League, and 23rd season at PNC Park. Before the season, Andrew McCutchen came back to the team via free agency. They will attempt to improve on their 62–100 record from last year, make the playoffs for the first time since 2015, and win their very first NL Central title.

Offseason

Rule changes 
Pursuant to the CBA, new rule changes will be in place for the 2023 season:

 institution of a pitch clock between pitches;
 limits on pickoff attempts per plate appearance;
 limits on defensive shifts requiring two infielders to be on either side of second and be within the boundary of the infield; and
 larger bases (increased to 18-inch squares);

Regular season

Game Log

|- style="background: 
| 30 || May 2 || @ Rays || – || || || — || || – ||
|- style="background: 
| 31 || May 3 || @ Rays || – || || || — || || – ||
|- style="background: 
| 32 || May 4 || @ Rays || – || || || — || || – ||
|- style="background: 
| 33 || May 5 || Blue Jays || – || || || — || || – ||
|- style="background: 
| 34 || May 6 || Blue Jays || – || || || — || || – ||
|- style="background: 
| 35 || May 7 || Blue Jays || – || || || — || || – ||
|- style="background: 
| 36 || May 8 || Rockies || – || || || — || || – ||
|- style="background: 
| 37 || May 9 || Rockies || – || || || — || || – ||
|- style="background: 
| 38 || May 10 || Rockies || – || || || — || || – ||
|- style="background: 
| 39 || May 12 || @ Orioles || – || || || — || || – ||
|- style="background: 
| 40 || May 13 || @ Orioles || – || || || — || || – ||
|- style="background: 
| 41 || May 14 || @ Orioles || – || || || — || || – ||
|- style="background: 
| 42 || May 16 || @ Tigers || – || || || — || || – ||
|- style="background: 
| 43 || May 17 || @ Tigers || – || || || — || || – ||
|- style="background: 
| 44 || May 19 || Diamondbacks || – || || || — || || – ||
|- style="background: 
| 45 || May 20 || Diamondbacks || – || || || — || || – ||
|- style="background: 
| 46 || May 21 || Diamondbacks || – || || || — || || – ||
|- style="background: 
| 47 || May 22 || Rangers || – || || || — || || – ||
|- style="background: 
| 48 || May 23 || Rangers || – || || || — || || – ||
|- style="background: 
| 49 || May 24 || Rangers || – || || || — || || – ||
|- style="background: 
| 50 || May 26 || @ Mariners || – || || || — || || – ||
|- style="background: 
| 51 || May 27 || @ Mariners || – || || || — || || – ||
|- style="background: 
| 52 || May 28 || @ Mariners || – || || || — || || – ||
|- style="background: 
| 53 || May 29 || @ Giants || – || || || — || || – ||
|- style="background: 
| 54 || May 30 || @ Giants || – || || || — || || – ||
|- style="background: 
| 55 || May 31 || @ Giants || – || || || — || || – ||
|- 
 

|- style="background: 
| 82 || July 1 || Brewers || – || || || — || || – ||
|- style="background: 
| 83 || July 2 || Brewers || – || || || — || || – ||
|- style="background: 
| 84 || July 3 || @ Dodgers || – || || || — || || – ||
|- style="background: 
| 85 || July 4 || @ Dodgers || – || || || — || || – ||
|- style="background: 
| 86 || July 5 || @ Dodgers || – || || || — || || – ||
|- style="background: 
| 87 || July 6 || @ Dodgers || – || || || — || || – ||
|- style="background: 
| 88 || July 7 || @ Diamondbacks || – || || || — || || – ||
|- style="background: 
| 89 || July 8 || @ Diamondbacks || – || || || — || || – ||
|- style="background: 
| 90 || July 9 || @ Diamondbacks || – || || || — || || – ||
|-style=background:#bbbfff 
|colspan=10|93rd All-Star Game in Seattle, Washington
|- style="background: 
| 91 || July 14 || Giants || – || || || — || || – ||
|- style="background: 
| 92 || July 15 || Giants || – || || || — || || – ||
|- style="background: 
| 93 || July 16 || Giants || – || || || — || || – ||
|- style="background: 
| 94 || July 17 || Guardians || – || || || — || || – ||
|- style="background: 
| 95 || July 18 || Guardians || – || || || — || || – ||
|- style="background: 
| 96 || July 19 || Guardians || – || || || — || || – ||
|- style="background: 
| 97 || July 21 || @ Angels || – || || || — || || – ||
|- style="background: 
| 98 || July 22 || @ Angels || – || || || — || || – ||
|- style="background: 
| 99 || July 23 || @ Angels || – || || || — || || – ||
|- style="background: 
| 100 || July 24 || @ Padres || – || || || — || || – ||
|- style="background: 
| 101 || July 25 || @ Padres || – || || || — || || – ||
|- style="background: 
| 102 || July 26 || @ Padres || – || || || — || || – ||
|- style="background: 
| 103 || July 28 || Phillies || – || || || — || || – ||
|- style="background: 
| 104 || July 29 || Phillies || – || || || — || || – ||
|- style="background: 
| 105 || July 30 || Phillies || – || || || — || || – ||
|- 
 

|- style="background: 
| 106 || August 1 || Tigers || – || || || — || || – ||
|- style="background: 
| 107 || August 2 || Tigers || – || || || — || || – ||
|- style="background: 
| 108 || August 3 || @ Brewers || – || || || — || || – ||
|- style="background: 
| 109 || August 4 || @ Brewers || – || || || — || || – ||
|- style="background: 
| 110 || August 5 || @ Brewers || – || || || — || || – ||
|- style="background: 
| 111 || August 6 || @ Brewers || – || || || — || || – ||
|- style="background: 
| 112 || August 7 || Braves || – || || || — || || – ||
|- style="background: 
| 113 || August 8 || Braves || – || || || — || || – ||
|- style="background: 
| 114 || August 9 || Braves || – || || || — || || – ||
|- style="background: 
| 115 || August 10 || Braves || – || || || — || || – ||
|- style="background: 
| 116 || August 11 || Reds || – || || || — || || – ||
|- style="background: 
| 117 || August 12 || Reds || – || || || — || || – ||
|- style="background: 
| 118 || August 13 || Reds || – || || || — || || – ||
|- style="background: 
| 119 || August 14 || @ Mets || – || || || — || || – ||
|- style="background: 
| 120 || August 15 || @ Mets || – || || || — || || – ||
|- style="background: 
| 121 || August 16 || @ Mets || – || || || — || || – ||
|- style="background: 
| 122 || August 18 || @ Twins || – || || || — || || – ||
|- style="background: 
| 123 || August 19 || @ Twins || – || || || — || || – ||
|- style="background: 
| 124 || August 20 || @ Twins || – || || || — || || – ||
|- style="background: 
| 125 || August 21 || Cardinals || – || || || — || || – ||
|- style="background: 
| 126 || August 22 || Cardinals || – || || || — || || – ||
|- style="background: 
| 127 || August 23 || Cardinals || – || || || — || || – ||
|- style="background: 
| 128 || August 24 || Cubs || – || || || — || || – ||
|- style="background: 
| 129 || August 25 || Cubs || – || || || — || || – ||
|- style="background: 
| 130 || August 26 || Cubs || – || || || — || || – ||
|- style="background: 
| 131 || August 27 || Cubs || – || || || — || || – ||
|- style="background: 
| 132 || August 28 || @ Royals || – || || || — || || – ||
|- style="background: 
| 133 || August 29 || @ Royals || – || || || — || || – ||
|- style="background: 
| 134 || August 30 || @ Royals || – || || || — || || – ||
|- 
 

|- style="background: 
| 135 || September 1 || @ Cardinals || – || || || — || || – ||
|- style="background: 
| 136 || September 2 || @ Cardinals || – || || || — || || – ||
|- style="background: 
| 137 || September 3 || @ Cardinals || – || || || — || || – ||
|- style="background: 
| 138 || September 4 || Brewers || – || || || — || || – ||
|- style="background: 
| 139 || September 5 || Brewers || – || || || — || || – ||
|- style="background: 
| 140 || September 6 || Brewers || – || || || — || || – ||
|- style="background: 
| 141 || September 8 || @ Braves || – || || || — || || – ||
|- style="background: 
| 142 || September 9 || @ Braves || – || || || — || || – ||
|- style="background: 
| 143 || September 10 || @ Braves || – || || || — || || – ||
|- style="background: 
| 144 || September 11 || Nationals || – || || || — || || – ||
|- style="background: 
| 145 || September 12 || Nationals || – || || || — || || – ||
|- style="background: 
| 146 || September 13 || Nationals || – || || || — || || – ||
|- style="background: 
| 147 || September 14 || Nationals || – || || || — || || – ||
|- style="background: 
| 148 || September 15 || Yankees || – || || || — || || – ||
|- style="background: 
| 149 || September 16 || Yankees || – || || || — || || – ||
|- style="background: 
| 150 || September 17 || Yankees || – || || || — || || – ||
|- style="background: 
| 151 || September 19 || @ Cubs || – || || || — || || – ||
|- style="background: 
| 152 || September 20 || @ Cubs || – || || || — || || – ||
|- style="background: 
| 153 || September 21 || @ Cubs || – || || || — || || – ||
|- style="background: 
| 154 || September 22 || @ Reds || – || || || — || || – ||
|- style="background: 
| 155 || September 23 || @ Reds || – || || || — || || – ||
|- style="background: 
| 156 || September 24 || @ Reds || – || || || — || || – ||
|- style="background: 
| 157 || September 26 || @ Phillies || – || || || — || || – ||
|- style="background: 
| 158 || September 27 || @ Phillies || – || || || — || || – ||
|- style="background: 
| 159 || September 28 || @ Phillies || – || || || — || || – ||
|- style="background: 
| 160 || September 29 || Marlins || – || || || — || || – ||
|- style="background: 
| 161 || September 30 || Marlins || – || || || — || || – ||
|- style="background: 
| 162 || October 1 || Marlins || – || || || — || || – ||
|-

National League Central

National League Wild Card

Roster

Farm system

Notes

References

External links
Pittsburgh Pirates 2023 schedule at MLB.com

Pittsburgh Pirates seasons
Pittsburgh Pirates
Pittsburgh Pirates
2020s in Pittsburgh